Fort Branch Site is a historic archaeological site located near Hamilton, Martin County, North Carolina.  Fort Branch was built in 1862 and improved in mid- to late 1864.  It sits 70 feet above a bend in the Roanoke River, and the Confederate States Army earthen fort provided a safe and clear view of Union gunboats approaching from down river.  The fort site has undergone restoration by the Fort Branch Battlefield Commission, Inc.

It was listed on the National Register of Historic Places in 1973.

References

American Civil War forts
Archaeological sites on the National Register of Historic Places in North Carolina
Buildings and structures in Martin County, North Carolina
National Register of Historic Places in Martin County, North Carolina